Monteil is a French surname. Notable people with the surname include:

Adhémar de Monteil, (died 1098), French bishop and soldier
Amans-Alexis Monteil (1769–1850), French historian
Charles Monteil (1871–1949), French civil servant, ethnologist and linguist. Brother of Parfait-Louis Monteil.
Claudine Monteil (born 1949), French writer
Germaine Monteil, French fashion designer
Jean-Baptiste Adhémar de Monteil de Grignan, (1638–1697), French bishop
Parfait-Louis Monteil (1855–1925), French military officer and explorer. Brother of Charles Monteil.
Vincent Monteil (born 1964), French conductor

See also
 Monteils (disambiguation)

French-language surnames